The badminton competition at the 2022 ASEAN University Games took place at UBRU Main Campus Gymnasium in Ubon Ratchathani, Thailand. 7 events were featured similarly to the past edition.

Medal table

Medalists

References

External links
  

2022 in badminton